Shahid Esau is a South African politician and a former member of parliament for the Democratic Alliance. He was a member of the Portfolio Committee on Defence and Military Veterans (National Assembly Committees) from 20 June 2014 until 7 May 2019.

He was previously the Speaker of the Western Cape Provincial Legislature under Helen Zille's provincial administration.

External links 
People's Assembly biography

References

Year of birth missing (living people)
Living people
Democratic Alliance (South Africa) politicians
People from the Western Cape
Members of the Western Cape Provincial Parliament